Heddon Greta is a suburb of the Cessnock LGA in the Hunter Region of New South Wales, Australia. It lies mainly to the north of the Hunter Expressway.

Notable people 
Josh Pickering

References

Suburbs of City of Cessnock
Towns in the Hunter Region